Hotel Babylon is a British television drama series based on the 2004 book of the same name by Imogen Edwards-Jones, that aired from 19 January 2006 to 14 August 2009, produced by independent production company Carnival Films for BBC One. The show followed the lives of workers at a glamorous five-star hotel.

The show was cancelled after its fourth series, leaving the series 4 finale cliffhanger unresolved.

Cast and characters

Main cast 

 Tamzin Outhwaite as Rebecca Mitchell – (series 1–2) former general manager.
 Max Beesley as Charlie Edwards – (series 1–3, guest series 4) the former general manager, former deputy manager, former head receptionist
 Dexter Fletcher as Tony Casemore – (series 1–4) the head concierge.
 Emma Pierson as Anna Thornton-Wilton – (series 1–4 episode 3) the former head receptionist.
 Natalie Mendoza as Jackie Clunes – (series 1–3) the former head of housekeeping.
 Martin Marquez as Gino Primirola – (series 1–4) the head barman.
 Michael Obiora as Ben Trueman – (series 1–4) the acting head receptionist, formerly receptionist.
 Ray Coulthard as James Schofield – (recurring series 1, main series 2-4) the food and beverage manager.
 Alexandra Moen as Emily James – (series 3–4) the PR manager.
 Lee Williams as Jack Harrison – (series 3) former general manager, former deputy manager.
 Nigel Harman as Sam Franklin – (series 4) the hotel owner.
 Anna Wilson-Jones as Juliet Miller – (series 4) the general manager.
 Danira Gović as Tanja Mihajlov – (recurring series 1–3, main series 4) the head of housekeeping, formerly maid.
 Amy Nuttall as Melanie Hughes – (series 4) the receptionist.

Sam Franklin

Sam Franklin arrives at the beginning of the fourth series, when London is brought to a halt by terrorist alarms. He becomes involved in affairs when he encourages the staff to open the hotel to as many people as possible, and it is revealed that he is the ex-husband of Juliet, who is overseeing the closure of the hotel. The charismatic, attractive businessman was previously unsuccessful but due to investments in a Chinese wind farm has now become a multi-millionaire. When a potential deal falls through, he steps in and buys the hotel himself, saving it from closure.

When he loses everything except the hotel, he becomes heavily involved in management, leading to tensions between himself and his ex-wife. Despite their divorce, they decide to celebrate their wedding anniversary and thereafter renew their sexual relationship. However, when he discovers that she had had an abortion when he left, they break up, and he begins to fall for Emily, the PR manager.

Juliet Miller

Juliet Miller (previously Franklin) arrived originally as a bailiff when the hotel was facing closure in the opener of series four, but took the job of general manager when ex-husband Sam bought Babylon. She is described as professional and first rate at her job, Juliet takes no prisoners and has no room for sentiment when livelihoods and millions of pounds are at stake. Juliet has no issue making tough decisions but when it comes to her personal life she is thrown off course when former husband Sam turns up at the hotel.  However, the two decided to work together and became friendly together.  However, in episode 5, a brief incident involving Meredith Sutton made a rupture in the relationship.  Meredith Sutton was a consultant who Sam hired to build the hotel's management team.  However, Meredith was actually Sam's girlfriend and Juliet grew jealous and briefly left Hotel Babylon.  Meredith Sutton opted for the job and Sam agreed until he found out a minute later that she had tampered with the exercise. Sam went after Juliet and managed to get her to return.

Tony Casemore

Tony Casemore is played by actor Dexter Fletcher. He first appeared in Series 1, Episode 1. Emily James stated that Casemore knows London inside out. The character is currently the head concierge but his previous role was Deputy Manager. Casemore is married and has two children; his daughter appears in Series 3. It is revealed in Series 3 that his family are often irritated at him for being at work a lot of the time. Casemore takes his work very seriously and gets annoyed when Rebecca Mitchell says the word concierge sounds "seedy". He uses his knowledge of London to help the guests anyway he can, in some cases this includes finding prostitutes. Casemore has a good friendship with his fellow workers at the hotel, in particular Anna; their relationship could be described as paternal as well as good friends.

Dexter Fletcher said on his character, "Yes he is a good family man and he always tries to make the right decision. The writers are really challenging Tony's values this series." "He sacrifices a lot in order to create a comfortable family life at home for his wife and children, and there is always that unintentional clash because he does work so hard he never gets to see his family." "When his daughter Liz turns up at the hotel for an audition a lot of home truths hit him and he is forced to reassess his position both as a father and within the hotel."

Gino Primirola

Gino Primirola is played by actor Martin Marquez. He first appeared in the series in Series 1, Episode 1. Gino has worked at the bar in the hotel for many years. A native of Rome, Italy, he grew up in Spain and still has a strong Spanish accent.

He currently holds the Barman of the Year Award (2007). He is known as a creative mixologist, developing new drinks.

James Schofield

James Schofield is played by Ray Coulthard. He is the food and beverage manager, although in series three it was revealed that he is on a permanent diet, after having lost weight following the advice of a man who stayed at the hotel.

From the beginning of the series, James is shown to be somewhat socially conservative, serving as something of a foil for Gino, who has more of a sympathy for the poor and less fortunate stemming from his own upbringing. In series two, James is also shown to have a gambling addiction after selling his BMW car to pay for his gambling addiction.  James also secretly reveals to Ben that his wine tasting skills are a fraud and possesses no talent for wine tasting!

Emily James

Emily Rushby (work name Emily James) is played by Alexandra Moen. She appeared at the beginning of the third series posing as a journalist attempting to seize incriminating information from the staff before revealing herself as the new manager of PR, much to the chagrin of the staff. It was revealed in the second episode of the fourth series that she is the daughter of the hotelier, Damien Rushby, who briefly becomes owner of Babylon, however she wishes to find her own way in the hotel industry. Emily can speak fluent German which is revealed when she pretends to be a Liechtenstein princess for Sam's PR fake wedding. Emily purchased the engagement ring from famous Jeweler 'Polished Diamonds' which was custom made. Ben acts out as one of the United Kingdom's richest men marrying the princess and falls in love with Emily briefly.

Benjamin "Ben" Trueman

Benjamin "Ben" Trueman is played by Michael Obiora. He is openly gay, proud of his sexuality, and often provides comic relief. He is a receptionist and works with Head Receptionist, Anna Thornton-Wilton.

Growing up he took cocaine with his friend as revealed in Series 2. In the same series, it is revealed his friend is now a rapper and books into Hotel Babylon, Ben avoids him as it is well known he is homophobic. It is later revealed that Ben once kissed him when they were younger revealing this may be behind his hatred of gay men.

He is friends with the rest of staff but accuses Rebecca and Charlie of being racist out of anger of being the first to be told he and the rest of staff could lose their jobs in the second Series Finale.

Michel Obiora said on Ben Trueman from BBC.com, "Playing a gay character really brought out my feminine side and my girlfriend really liked it. She said I smiled a lot more and used my hands more to gesticulate. She really liked my camp side. She also thinks I take more time over my appearance now which I wasn't aware of."

Melanie Hughes

Melanie Hughes, played by actress Amy Nuttall, lands the job as the new receptionist at Hotel Babylon quite by accident when her boyfriend abandons her on the steps of Hotel Babylon in series four. After bluffing her way into the vacant post Ben takes her under his wing and turns ugly duckling Mel into a swan.

Tanja Mihajlov

Tanja Mihajlov is played by Danira Gović. Tanja is a member of the cleaning staff and plays a major role in the plot of first episode of Hotel Babylon. After she is viciously attacked by a woman in charge of the budget of the American rock band Junk Dogs (residing in the hotel), the staff schemes to get even with the malicious woman. Tanja was attacked because when she entered the Junk Dogs' room, she saw the woman sniffing cocaine. The lady was furious at Tanja and hit her, leaving several bruises on Tanja's face. While Tanja was struggling, she kept on saying "Dosta, dosta! (Enough, Enough!)"

In series 2 (episode 2) she is caught up with her horrific past in Croatia during the Croatian War of Independence. A guest named Michael Dović, an esteemed construction entrepreneur and family man from Croatia checks in. Tanja remembers his voice from the war during which he killed her friends and neighbours. He was then known as Dragan Milandroković. She confides to Charlie, but he thinks that she's probably mistaken because of her trauma. Disappointed about the hotel management's attitude towards her problem, she takes matters into her own hands desperate to prove she's right and to make the mercenary pay for his misdeeds.

Charlie looks up Milandroković's name on the Internet and finds a bunch of horrible and notorious articles about him. About Dović, on the other hand, he doesn't find anything incriminating. In fact, Dović even set up an orphanage for children with parents killed in the civil war. But when he anticipates Tanja's assault on Dović, he realizes that he has had a plastic surgery and got a completely new identity. In the end Charlie helps her by having Milandroković discreetly arrested and kicked out of the hotel.

Tanja is from Croatia, and has an accent when speaking English, but is nevertheless well understood by the rest of the hotel staff. She speaks in her mother tongue on several occasions, often when she's furious because of something. In the first episode she says after being beaten up: "E, lipo je meni mater rekla 'Vrati se ti, kćeri, u Šibenik, oni su ti svi ludi!'" (I should've listened to my Mum when she said 'Come back to Šibenik, honey, they're all crazy!). Later, after being frustrated at the hotel manager who was trying to keep things hushed up, she says, "Ma, razumiš ti vraga crnoga!" ("You don't freakin' understand anything!").

Tanja mentions Šibenik, the Croatian city in which Danira Gović was born and raised. This implies that Tanja is a Dalmatian girl who speaks the Ikavian accent.

In Series 4 she becomes a main character appearing in the title card.

Anna Thornton-Wilton

Anna Edwards (née Thornton-Wilton) is played by actress Emma Pierson. She has been a main character since the series began. She is a comical character who isn't very intellectual, and she often follows her heart instead of her head, which provides humour in the show. She wears high heels and a very glossy 'Scarlet Rose' shade of lipstick as part of her receptionist uniform, but this adds to her 'ditzy' demeanour, increasing the comedic aspects of her character.

Anna arrived in episode 1 from 'The Chesterton' hotel to interview for the position of Deputy Manager at Hotel Babylon. Although a likely candidate for the job, she was beaten to the post by Charlie Edwards. Rebecca asked her to stay at Hotel Babylon as Head Receptionist, the post which Charlie gave up for Deputy Manager.

Anna is aspirational. She works in the luxury hotel business because not only does she feel completely at home - it's the only way she can afford to be a part of it.
She's gorgeous but knows it, and as far as she's concerned it's only a matter of time before she bags a wealthy and eligible man. Her sole ambition is to marry into the lifestyle she believes she deserves. But her plans become unstuck when Anna finds herself head over heels in love and not with the wealthy entrepreneur she's always dreamed of. Anna's posh persona is as fake as her hyphenated family name, as Series 2 reveals.

In Series 2 Episode 3, it is revealed that Anna's family are not so grand after all. A grand ball is organized for guest Lady Catherine Stanwood (played by Kelly Brook). Lady Catherine was once a former work-colleague of Anna's at 'The Chesterton' hotel before Catherine married Lord Stanwood. Anna is shocked and deeply envious of Catherine's new status which forces Anna to lie and self-promote herself to "Hotel Deputy Manager In-Waiting" to boost her perceived status in the hotel. Later, during the ball, Anna's actual role in the hotel is revealed to Catherine which prompts Catherine to accuse Anna of being a 'fake'.  Anna's father is publicly revealed by Catherine, to be a council clerk and her mother, a school dinner lady.  In a separate scene in the same episode, Anna also privately reveals to Charlie that her real family name is only 'Thornton', not 'Thornton-Wilton', which Anna has used throughout her career to elevate her social standing.  Later, Lady Catherine and Anna are friends again. Catherine also confirms a rumour to Anna that 'The Chesterton' hotel had a staff party after Anna left the Chesterton, to celebrate Anna's departure because she was so unpopular.

Before the events of the first series, it was revealed that Anna had slept with Charlie Edwards when they worked together at 'The Chesterton' hotel, prior to Series 1. They are friends until Series 3 when they start dating. However they broke up later in Series 3.

Anna is close friends with the rest of the staff in the hotel. At the end of series 3 she begins dating a surgeon; however, she rejected his proposal of marriage when she found he was using her to have children.

Emma Pierson said about Anna, "She has grown up a bit and changed a little but she is still naughty and irreverent underneath." "Having had two years of getting to know each other Anna and Jackie have very much settled their differences and now get on, despite having a new female colleague on the floor (Emily)."

In the first episode of Series 4, Anna seems to be very, very pregnant but who is the father?
Anna finds that her colleagues are taking bets on who they think the father is and this leads to a small fall out. Just to keep them quiet Anna asks Darren, one of the waiters to pretend to be the father. The waiter gets slightly carried away and thinks that Anna is really in love with him.
A book is published giving clues about where some emeralds are hidden in the hotel. Anna finds them and gives one of them to Tony on her departure.
Later in the series, Anna goes into labour during the day.
Charlie returns and is the father of her baby.
Charlie proposes to her.
Anna gives birth to a healthy baby girl named Scarlett Rose - named after her lipstick.
Anna and Charlie leave with Scarlett with the rest of the jewels hidden under her sleeve.

Charlie Edwards

Charles "Charlie" Edwards is played by Max Beesley. he first appeared in Series 1, Episode 1 and last appeared in Series 4, Episode 3 to propose to Anna. After the departure of Rebecca Mitchell (Tamzin Outhwaite), Charlie became manager. Beesley also narrates the series mostly informing the viewers of hotel events and activities (e.g. the hotel rating system and hotel thefts). He has also been in prison for a year

Not a lot of his past is mentioned in the show. He has worked in other hotels, such as the Chesterton. The BBC character description describes his past as "complex". Charlie also has a brother, Dan, who appears in an episode of the second series (played by Chris Coghill). He is indicated to be considerably less successful than Charlie and to have got on the wrong side of the law several times.

Edwards spent 12 months in prison after being sentenced for 18 months. He informed guest "Bones" or Mr Wiltshire (full name not mentioned) of his sentence. This was because of fraud. He did not mention this on his application form and therefore nearly got fired. Several times, Charlie uses skills that he might've picked up within the prison system, such as criminal knowledge or fighting ability (shown during an episode in the second series, where he manages to subdue a staff member holding a guest hostage with a swift and accurate punch).

During the first series, Edwards was dating Jackie. They reserved rooms to spend the night. Their relationship was kept discreet at the start. Charlie kissed Rebecca at the staff Christmas party in series two. They arranged to have dinner soon after, but due to complications involving Charlie's younger brother, never did. They eventually agreed to keep their relationship professional, though Rebecca kissed him goodbye in the series two finale. Charlie and Anna dated in series 3, but split up just before Charlie left.

Charlie comes under a lot of pressure when he replaces Rebecca as the General Manager of Hotel Babylon. He receives an email that informs that the Hotel's profits are down by a lot and is then unable to pay the cleaners due to a mix up with wages. He is forced to take out a loan with a friend from when he was in prison to pay the cleaners however, his friend wants the money back sooner than Charlie can get it back. Charlie is called up to a room by Jackie who has accidentally killed a thug who was stealing from cleaners. Charlie realises the thug was taking the money to pay back Charlie's debt and so helps Jackie, with the aid of Tanja, dispose of the body. Charlie then leaves when his friend, Hutch, makes him an offer to travel with him.

Max Beesley said about Charlie, "It's a bit different playing the General Manager now because there is more responsibility for Charlie. Even though he is not running around like a headless chicken, like he was in the first series, he has to be more centred because there is a lot of pressure on him."

He is the father to Anna's daughter, Scarlett Rose. He has moved to New York with Anna and Scarlett.

Jack Harrison

Jack Harrison is played by Lee Williams. He first appeared in Series 3, Episode 4. He was General Manager. The character joined the staff of Hotel Babylon in its 3rd Series, intending to be the Deputy Manager, but after Charlie Edwards (played by Max Beesley) left, the general manager position became vacant and he was promoted to General Manager. In Episode One of Series Four after more than a year as manager it was revealed that Jack had left the hotel and was replaced by Juliet; Tony hinted that Jack had taken the blame for the imminent closure of Hotel Babylon and was sacked by the directors of the hotel.

Jackie Clunes

Jackie Clunes is played by Natalie Mendoza. She first appeared in Series 1, Episode 1 and was a fictional character until she was written out in Series 3, Episode 5. She is Australian and many of her staff are immigrants, some are even revealed to be in the country illegally in series 1 and she herself was almost deported after it was revealed her visa had run out.

Jackie has a son and was almost married. However, her fiancée left her which made her an illegal immigrant due to her being on his visa. Jackie had a new five-month visa in series 1 after cutting a deal with immigration.

Jackie is in charge of cleaners at the hotel whom she treats with respect. She often looks after the cleaners and refers to them as "her girls". She has a friendly relationship with most of the other staff. In series 1, she has somewhat of a rivalry with Anna.

Jackie left after an accident left a thug dead in the hotel. She confronted the thug in a room after he stole from the cleaners due to a debt Charlie had with his client. The thug attacked Jackie, prompting her to run into the bathroom and lock the door. Jackie sprayed shampoo on the floor and grabbed an ornament to use as a weapon. The thug broke into the bathroom and walked towards Jackie, however slipped on the shampoo and hit his head on the edge of the bath, which killed him instantly. With the aid of Charlie and Tanja, Jackie had the body disposed of, and Jackie and her son flew back to Australia.

Rebecca Mitchell

Rebecca Mitchell is played by Tamzin Outhwaite. She was arguably the main character, appearing first on cast introduction in the opening credits. However, at the end of series 2 she is written off and has not appeared in the series since. She was the General Manager of Hotel Babylon until she resigned; she was generally quite strict with staff but seemed to have good relationship with them.

During the first series Rebecca has a troubled marriage and often sleeps in the hotel when she is left at home alone. Rebecca's marriage does recover; however, she does divorce her husband eventually and in the second series finds out her now ex-husband is in a romantic relationship with a friend of hers.

Rebecca is usually quite strict with staff and often got annoyed with Anna for being late for work on numerous occasions in the first series. In the second series she has a romantic relationship with Charlie. However she becomes suspicious of him when she sees him with another woman and it is presumed they have split up since she left.

Rebecca left at the end of Series 2. After the hotel was nearly taken over by hotel tycoon Donovan Credo, Rebecca was forced to lay off Jackie, James, Ben, Gino and Anna, before revealing to Tony that he and Charlie have been selected to stay. Tony's reaction to this prompts Rebecca to take action to call off the deal, preventing Credo buying out and gutting Hotel Babylon. This one false move causes Rebecca to lose the trust of her staff. On leaving her office, Rebecca tells Charlie to "make himself comfortable". When she has left, he sits down and reads an email on the screen that names him as Hotel Babylon's new General Manager. He chases after Rebecca, asking her what's going on. She tells him she is leaving, because all in all the hotel ruined her marriage and her life.

Guests
The show often attracts well known actors and celebrities, normally posing as guests staying at the hotel.

Series 1
 Martin Ball
 Keith Allen
 Joan Collins
 Susie Amy
 Dugald Bruce Lockhart
 Les Dennis
 Steve Pemberton
 Anthony Head
 Rachael Stirling
 Anamaria Marinca
 Jamie Theakston
 Zoe Tapper
 Craig Kelly

Series 2
 John Schwab
 Chris Moyles
 David Walliams
 Zöe Salmon
 Christopher Parker
 Danny Dyer
 Kelly Brook
 Kacey Ainsworth
 Chantelle Houghton
 Ronni Ancona
 Russ Abbot
 Samuell Benta
 Cherie Lunghi
 Jennifer Ellison
 Julian Clary
 Gina Bellman
 Mark Heap
 Richard Bacon
 Alexander Armstrong
 Vanessa Feltz
 Jerry Hall
 John Sessions

Series 3
 Adèle Anderson
 Bonnie Langford
Samantha Bond
 John Barrowman
 Jude Law
 Travis Oliver
 Kwame Kwei-Armah
 Megan Dodds
 Anita Dobson
 Daniel Lapaine
 Jeremy Sheffield
 Alan Davies
 Jon Culshaw
 Paula Abdul
 Nicola Stephenson
 Lesley Garrett
 Lee Sharpe
 Marc Bannerman
 Donna Air
 James Lance
 Nigel Quashie
 Nicholas Rowe
 Don Gilet
 Nathaniel Parker
 Bob Goody
 Abigail Peel
 Sophie Wu
 Paul Kaye
 Jason Watkins
 John Marquez

Series 4
 Preeya Kalidas
 Chris Bisson
 Ernest Ignatius
 Abi Titmuss
 Ben Fogle
 Patrick Baladi
 Caroline Catz
 Honor Blackman
 Tony Robinson
 Michael Winner
 Christopher Cazenove
 Frances Barber
 Alex Zane
 Denise van Outen
 James Fleet
 Janet Ellis
 Darius Danesh
 Kelly Osbourne
 John Savident
 Hugh Dennis
 Michelle Collins
 Thaila Zucchi
 Ruby Turner

Episodes 

There were four series broadcast, each consisting of 8 episodes. An episode is one hour long, although rebroadcasts in other countries are edited for length. An episode also begins and ends with a short comment from one of the main characters outlining that episode's theme.

Series 1 (2006)

Series 2 (2007)

Series 3 (2008)

Series 4 (2009)

Location 
A zoom out from the hotel's location at the end of Series 1, Episode 4, reveals the location of the hotel as being at Cleveland House, 33 King Street, a short distance north of St. James's Park.

Reception 
The show achieved high ratings at around 5 million viewers each episode and winning its time slot. The programme often beat shows shown on other channels in the same time slot, such as Eleventh Hour, Footballers' Wives, and Ladette to Lady, all shown on ITV. Despite Tamzin Outhwaite's departure at the end of series 2, the show managed to maintain similar figures to the first two series during the first half of series 3. However, after Max Beesley's departure at the middle of series 3, the show saw a decline in figures from 5 to 4 million viewers.

The finale of the first series obtained 5.74 million viewers; the second series opened with 5.79 million before rising to 6.6 million viewers for episode 2. The fourth series opened with 4.28 million (20.1%).

Home media releases 
The DVDs are released by BBC Worldwide through 2 Entertain. Series One was released on DVD in the UK on 19 March 2007, and in the US and Canada on 12 February 2008. This series was also released in high definition in the UK on HD DVD (Combo disc) and Blu-ray Disc on 5 November 2007. Series Two was initially slated for release in the UK on 30 September 2007 but was released on 17 March 2008. Internationally, it was released on 14 February 2008 in Australia and 5 August 2008 in the US and Canada. Series Three was released on DVD in the US and Canada on 3 March 2009 (released before it premiered on BBC America). In the UK, it was on 13 July 2009. Series Four was released on DVD on 17 August 2009 in the UK.

All series have been released digitally in SD and HD via the iTunes Store in the UK.

Soundtrack

Hotel Babylon: The Music, a musical album, was released in March 2008, a few days after the third episode of series three. The soundtrack was produced by Jim Williams and John Lunn.

Track listing

References

External links 
 
 

2000s British drama television series
2006 British television series debuts
2009 British television series endings
BBC high definition shows
BBC television dramas
Fictional hotels
Television shows set in London
Television shows based on British novels
English-language television shows
Television series set in hotels